Linar Dinarovich Sharifullin (born 24 October 2001) is a Russian football player. He plays for FC Tyumen.

Club career
He made his debut in the Russian Football National League for FC Neftekhimik Nizhnekamsk on 25 September 2021 in a game against FC Krasnodar-2.

References

External links
 
 
 Profile by Russian Football National League

2001 births
Living people
Russian footballers
Association football midfielders
FC Neftekhimik Nizhnekamsk players
FC Tyumen players
Russian First League players